Stuhlmannia moavi is a species of flowering plants in the legume family, Fabaceae, and the only species in the genus Stuhlmannia. It belongs to the subfamily Caesalpinioideae. It is native to Kenya, Tanzania, and Madagascar.

References

Caesalpinieae
Monotypic Fabaceae genera
Flora of Kenya
Flora of Madagascar
Flora of Tanzania